High Peak Borough Council elections are held every four years. High Peak Borough Council is the local authority for the non-metropolitan district of High Peak in Derbyshire, England. Since the last boundary changes in 2015, 43 councillors have been elected from 28 wards.

Political control
The first election to the council was held in 1973, initially operating as a shadow authority before coming into its powers on 1 April 1974. Since 1973 political control of the council has been held by the following parties:

Leadership
The leaders of the council since 2003 have been:

Council elections
1973 High Peak Borough Council election
1976 High Peak Borough Council election
1979 High Peak Borough Council election (New ward boundaries reduced the number of seats by 2)
1983 High Peak Borough Council election
1987 High Peak Borough Council election
1991 High Peak Borough Council election (Borough boundary changes took place but the number of seats remained the same)
1995 High Peak Borough Council election (Borough boundary changes took place but the number of seats remained the same)
1999 High Peak Borough Council election
2003 High Peak Borough Council election (New ward boundaries reduced the number of seats by 1)
2007 High Peak Borough Council election
2011 High Peak Borough Council election
2015 High Peak Borough Council election (New ward boundaries)
2019 High Peak Borough Council election

By-election results

1995-1999

1999-2003

2003-2007

2007-2011

2011-2015

2015-2019

2019-2023

References

By-election results

External links
High Peak Council

 
Council elections
High Peak
High Peak